Tadeusz Zieliński may refer to:
 Tadeusz J. Zieliński (born 1966), Polish lawyer and Protestant theologian
 Tadeusz Stefan Zieliński (1859–1944), Polish philologist and historian
 Tadeusz Zieliński (athlete) (1946–1977), Polish middle-distance runner
 Thaddeus Zielinski (1916–1990), American bishop